Samuel Constant Snellen van Vollenhoven (18 October 1816, Rotterdam – 22 March 1880) was a Dutch entomologist. He is not to be confused with Pieter Cornelius Tobias Snellen another entomologist from Rotterdam.

He was curator of the entomological collections for the Natural History Museum, Leiden from 1854 to 1873, when he retired due to health problems. In 1857 he founded Tijdschrift voor Entomologie, a journal of systematic and evolutionary entomology published by the Netherlands Entomological Society. Snellen van Vollenhoven was a founder member of this Society. He described 9 genera and 471 species of insects. With Frederik Maurits van der Wulp he compiled the first checklist of the Diptera of the Netherlands.

References

External links

The colour plates not illustrated.
Internet Archive Pinacographia Illustrations of more than 1,000 species of north-west-European Ichneumonide, sensu Linnaeano Afbeeldingen van meer dan 1,000 soorten noord-west-europeesche sluipwespen (ichneumones sensu Linnaeano) (1880) Text in English and Dutch
Internet Archive Essai d'une faune entomologique de l'archipel Indonéerlandais (1865)Include colour plates

1818 births
1880 deaths
Dutch entomologists
Scientists from Rotterdam